The Foxdale Railway was a  narrow gauge branch line which ran from St. John's to Foxdale on the Isle of Man.

History

The line was officially opened by the Foxdale Railway Company Ltd. (registered on ) on  allowing rail access to the lead mining workings around the village of Foxdale.  The company had close ties to the Manx Northern Railway (MNR), many of whose directors were also on the board of the smaller company. The line was leased from the outset by the MNR.

Shortly after the line had opened, the lead mining industry started to decline and in  the Foxdale company went into liquidation. The fortunes of the MNR were closely tied to the Foxdale line due to the terms of the lease being favourable to the smaller concern. Much of the MNR's freight revenue originated in Foxdale, with loaded wagons of lead being transported to the harbour in Ramsey and coal and mine supplies ferried back to the mines.

Decline and closure 

The last lead mine in the area closed in 1911 and from then on only spoil trains and the infrequent passenger and general goods services used the line. From , tickets were no longer sold at Foxdale station, the station building being converted into a private dwelling during the 1920s. The last regular passenger train worked the branch in 1940, after which the service was replaced by buses. The line saw some troop specials during the Second World War as well as spoil trains and the occasional passenger service, run due to bus shortages. The rails were finally removed during the mid-1970s and much of the route is now a designated public walkway.

Today, the station building at St. John's is still in place but now a private dwelling, similarly at the other end of the line the station is extant, was used as a youth club for local children for a number of years before becoming the home of the Foxdale Heritage Centre.  The stanchions of the former viaduct also remain in place and there are still some rails visible in the road at the outer terminus. It is little known that the famous Scissors crossing behind the station is actually still in situ to this day, although unknown to most people as it was buried underneath a bank of hardcore from the mines(there are actually images  which shows this happening). This possibly means that Foxdale has the distinction of being the station on the IoM's closed network which still has most of the original station trackwork surviving.

The route and services

The line ran from an end-on junction with the MNR west of St. John's, then passed to the north of the IMR station before curving south and crossing the IMR's line from Douglas via an overbridge (the only place where railway crossed railway on the Isle of Man unless one counts the 19-inch gauge Great Laxey Mines Railway tunnel under the Manx Electric Railway) to the east of the station. The line had a fairly constant incline through Waterfall Halt, the only intermediate station, to the terminus in Upper Foxdale. The tracks extended beyond Foxdale into the mine workings area. There were at one time plans to extend the line to join with the IMR's Port Erin line at Ballasalla, but these came to nothing.

The railway initially used the MNR station at St. John's, situated to the west of the IMR station. Later, in 1886, the MNR abandoned this and built a new platform and station building on the alignment of the Foxdale Railway more closely adjacent to the IMR station. Foxdale line trains used this facility until 1927, after which trains reversed in and out of the IMR station.

Upon the opening of the railway, the MNR ran some services from Ramsey to Foxdale, but passenger traffic on the line was always light and these services gave way to local shuttles between St. John's and Foxdale. Latterly, passenger services consisted of a loco and one coach. The coach used was specifically made for the branch and survives today (see The Foxdale Coach).

The MNR purchased a more powerful locomotive to work goods services over the branch and its steep gradients (see Caledonia).

See also

Foxdale
Manx Northern Railway
British narrow gauge railways

References

Railway lines in the Isle of Man
3 ft gauge railways in the Isle of Man